In Search of the Last Action Heroes is a 2019 documentary film written and directed by Oliver Harper, and co-written by Timon Singh. The film revisits the action films of the 1980s and 1990s, often regarded as the genre's Golden Age, via interviews with filmmakers and actors who were active during that time, or are viewed as their successors.

Cast

 Scott Adkins
 Shane Black
 Stan Bush
 Ronny Cox
 Boaz Davidson
 Steven E. de Souza
 Brad Fiedel
 Sam Firstenberg
 Mark Goldblatt
 Jeffrey Greenstein
 Mario Kassar
 Mark L. Lester
 Sheldon Lettich
 Peter MacDonald
 Zak Penn
 Phillip Rhee
 Eric Roberts
 Cynthia Rothrock
 Brian Tyler
 Paul Verhoeven
 Graham Yost
 Vernon Wells
 Michael Jai White

David J. Moore, author of the book The Good, the Tough, and the Deadly: Action Movies and Stars, and Ian Nathan, Empire Magazine journalist and author of the book The Terminator Vault, also appear.

Production
Director Harper worked in various capacities for British cinema chain Cineworld. Inspired by video retrospectives produced by gaming website Gametrailers, he started producing similar featurettes about classic action films, which he published on Blip and his own website Oliver Harper's Retrospectives and Reviews. Robin Block, a music documentarian looking to branch out into popular film history, came across Harper's series and offered to sponsor his work. The relationship evolved into a feature-length project. News of the documentary's production reached Timon Singh, an advertising creative and author of the book Born to Be Bad: Talking to the Greatest Villains in Action Cinema, who offered to collaborate on the venture and use the connections he had forged during the making of his book to arrange some of the film's interviews. Film journalist David A. Weiner, who would go on to direct his own documentaries for Block, served as a producer on the feature.

Release
In Search of the Last Action Heroes premiered on 18 December 2019 at the Castle Cinema in London, United Kingdom. The film was released on DVD and Blu-ray Disc by American distributor Gravitas Ventures on 21 January 2020.

Follow-ups
In Search of the Last Action Heroes launched a series of similar pop culture documentaries, which also includes In Search of Darkness, a trilogy about horror films, and In Search of Tomorrow, a science-fiction film retrospective. Those were directed by Weiner.
Harper went on to direct Here Comes a New Challenger, which examines the craze surrounding the Street Fighter transmedia franchise.

References

External links
 
 
 Oliver Harper's Retrospectives and Reviews

2019 documentary films
British documentary films
Documentary films about films
2010s English-language films
2010s British films